Al-Mundhir of Hira can refer to any of four Lakhmid rulers of al-Hira:

 al-Mundhir I ibn al-Nu'man (r. 418–462)
 al-Mundhir II ibn al-Mundhir (r. 490–497)
 al-Mundhir III ibn al-Nu'man (r. 503/5–554)
 al-Mundhir IV ibn al-Mundhir (r. 574–580)